Alberto Testa (23 December 1922 – 4 October 2019) was an Italian dancer, choreographer, dance critic and teacher, born in Turin, Kingdom of Italy.  He choreographed a number of ballets to operatic music, and worked on films with Franco Zeffirelli and Luchino Visconti. 

Testa died in Turin on 4 October 2019 at the age of 96.

References

1922 births
2019 deaths
Italian male ballet dancers
Italian choreographers
Entertainers from Turin
Ballet choreographers